Ambeth Rajan (born 9 February 1956 in Mayiladuthurai, Mayiladuthurai district (Tamil Nadu)) is a politician from Bharatiya Janata Party and a Member of the Parliament of India represented Uttar Pradesh in the Rajya Sabha, the upper house of the Indian Parliament.

He resides at Noida.

References

Living people
Bahujan Samaj Party politicians from Uttar Pradesh
Rajya Sabha members from Uttar Pradesh
1956 births
People from Mayiladuthurai district
Bharatiya Janata Party politicians from Uttar Pradesh